Giuseppe Vitale (born 10 September 1993) is an Italian football player who plays for Paceco.

Club career
He made his professional debut in the Serie B for Trapani on 19 October 2013 in a game against Spezia.

References

External links
 

1993 births
Footballers from Palermo
Living people
Italian footballers
Trapani Calcio players
A.S.D. Sorrento players
A.C. Tuttocuoio 1957 San Miniato players
Serie B players
Serie C players
Serie D players
Association football midfielders